James Martin (born 30 June 1972) is a British chef and television presenter, best known for his television work with the BBC and ITV.

Martin presented the BBC cookery series Saturday Kitchen from 2006 until 2016, before leaving the BBC.

More recently, Martin has presented James Martin's French Adventure (2017), Saturday Morning with James Martin (2017–present) and James Martin's American Adventure (2018) for ITV.

Early life
Martin's family were farmers on the Castle Howard estate where he helped his mother in the kitchen, igniting his interest in cuisine. He lived in Welburn, UK, where he attended Amotherby School in Malton and later on, Malton School.

Career

Early career
James Martin trained at Hostellerie De Plaisance, Saint-Émilion, France, and from there, spent two years as a Pastry Chef at Chewton Glen Hotel in the South of England.

Television
He first appeared on television in 1996 on programmes including James Martin: Yorkshire's Finest (set in various Yorkshire locations with an emphasis on Yorkshire cuisine), Ready Steady Cook and The Big Breakfast.

Martin co-presented BBC Food's Stately Suppers with Alistair Appleton, and then appeared on the Channel 4 programme Richard & Judy, where he would visit a member of the public in their own home who had been nominated to be cooked a 'comfort food' meal. From 2006 until 2016, he was the presenter of the BBC One show Saturday Kitchen.

In September 2011, James was tasked with revamping the menu and catering facilities at Scarborough General Hospital, for Operation Hospital Food for the BBC.  The show was recommissioned for a second and third series  which were shown on BBC One in 2013 and 2014 respectively.

In June 2013, The Roux Scholarship was shown on Watch. Martin joined the judging panel along with fellow celebrity chefs including Rick Stein, Raymond Blanc and Angela Hartnett.

In July 2013, Martin appeared alongside Angela Hartnett and Richard Corrigan on BBC One on a special edition of The Great British Menu entitled The Great British Budget Menu. The show aimed to highlight food poverty and involved the chefs cooking nutritious meals on a budget.

In September 2013, the programme James Martin's Food Map of Britain aired on BBC Two. There were 10 episodes with each focusing on a different region of Britain. James investigated the produce of each area and cooked two dishes per episode. Since 2013, he has been a judge on Junior Bake Off on the CBBC channel.

In October 2014, James presented a new daytime show for BBC One called Meet the Street which aimed to unite communities and reduce loneliness. In 2015, he guest presented numerous episodes of The One Show with Alex Jones. In 2015, Martin presented The Box, a daytime cookery series for BBC One.

In 2015, while attending the BBC Good Food Middle East Awards in Dubai, Martin witnessed the death of magazine boss, Dominic De Sousa whom he had been speaking with, just moments before the tabloid mogul stood up and suffered a fatal heart attack. This event had an effect on Martin and had a part in him later deciding to leave '"Saturday Kitchen.

In February and March 2016 Martin toured his first live show around the UK entitled 'Plates, mates and automobiles'.

Since September 2017, Martin has presented Saturday Morning with James Martin, a Saturday morning cookery show for ITV.

Journalism
Until 2013, Martin wrote a motoring column for UK newspaper The Mail on Sunday.

In 2009, Martin wrote in his column that he hated cyclists, and deliberately took pleasure in scaring them by driving an electric Tesla Roadster (2008) in a manner that startled a cycling group, forcing them off the road. Following criticism from cycling groups and professionals such as Bradley Wiggins and Stuart O'Grady, he apologised for the statements. Complaints said that the driving was illegal and dangerous.

Restaurants
Martin opened his restaurant, called "The Leeds Kitchen", inside the Alea Casino in Leeds in 2011. The casino, and with it the restaurant, closed in March 2013.

In 2012 he opened a restaurant inside The Talbot Hotel, Malton, North Yorkshire. The restaurant won a Michelin star at the end of 2012. In June 2013 it was reviewed by food critic Jay Rayner for The Observer who described his meal there as "three beautifully poised, close to faultless dishes". Martin left The Talbot in February 2015.

In September 2013 Martin opened his restaurant James Martin Manchester, specialising in modern British cuisine.

There are four branches of James Martin Kitchen bakery and cafe located at; airside at Stansted and Glasgow airports, inside Debenhams at intu Lakeside and at Manchester Piccadilly Train Station.

SpudULike by James Martin
In Autumn 2021, Martin teamed up with potato company Albert Bartlett to create the new menu for the launch of SpudULike by James Martin chain of restaurants. It is a relaunch of Spudulike that traded from 1974 to 2019.

Cookery School
James teaches at The Kitchen – Cookery School at Chewton Glen, a cookery school and relaxed dining restaurant in New Milton, Hampshire.

Wine
September 2021, Martin launched a range of premium French wines which are produced in the village of Névian near Narbonne in the Corbières region.

Personal life
In 2009, Martin gained a private pilot licence and then later on he qualified as a helicopter pilot.

He has two dogs named Cooper and Ralph.

Martin has been in a relationship with his long-term girlfriend Louise Davies, who is a TV producer, since 2011. James met Davies on Celebrity Who Wants to Be a Millionaire?Martin raced in the 2013 Masters Series in an Appendix K 1964 Mini Cooper S. On 23 June 2013 he took his first race win at the Brands Hatch Mini Festival, becoming the 2013 Champion of Mini Festival.

Martin also raced a "works" GT Aston Martin at the Aston Martin Centenary Festival in July 2013 where he achieved a position of 9th out of 30 racers.

Awards and honours
In 2010, Martin was awarded the title of Honorary Professor by the University of West London, London School of Hospitality and Tourism along with Michel Roux, Raymond Blanc and Anton Mosimann.

On 10 June 2013, Martin was honoured with The Craft Guild of Chefs Special Award. In 2015 he was named ‘TV Personality of the Year’ at the Fortnum & Mason Awards. James was inducted into the Guilde Internationale des Fromagers at the International Cheese Awards 2016.

In 2021, Martin was again voted ‘TV Personality of the Year’ at the Fortnum & Mason Awards. On 6 September 2021, Martin's Saturday Morning scooped Best Food Show at the TV Choice Awards. In November 2021, Martin won 'Most Influential Chef, Cook or Food Writer' award, and also 'Best Cookbook', for 'Great British Adventure: A celebration of Great British food' at the Great British Food Awards.

Filmography
Television

Books
 The Deli Cookbook  
 James Martin's Delicious!: The Deli Cookbook  
 Easy British Food  
 James Martin Desserts  
 James Martin's Great British Winter Cookbook 
 Eating In With James Martin 
 The Great British Village Show Cookbook 
 The Saturday Kitchen Cookbook 
 James Martin - The Collection  
 James Martin's Great British Dinners 
 Driven: Cooking in the Fast Lane - My Story  
 James Martin - Desserts  
 My Kitchen  
 Masterclass: Make Your Home Cooking Easier 
 James Martin Easy Everyday: The Essential Collection 
 Slow Cooking: Mouthwatering Recipes with Minimum Effort 
 Fast Cooking: Really Exciting Recipes in 20 Minutes 
 Home Comforts 
 Sweet 
 More Home Comforts 
 Slow Cooking 
 James Martin's French Adventure 
 James Martin's American Adventure 
 James Martin's Great British Adventure 
 James Martin's Islands To Highlands 
 James Martin's Complete Home Comforts 
 Butter 
 Potato''

Tours
 Plates, Mates And Automobiles (2016): 25 date tour across England, Scotland and Wales
 James Martin on the road...again (2018): 18 date tour across England, Scotland and Wales
 James Martin Live (2022): 18 date tour across England, Scotland and Wales

References

External links
 Official website
 
 James Martin: Good Food Channel recipes
 James Martin: Home Comforts recipes

1972 births
Living people
People from Malton, North Yorkshire
English television chefs